Craig Morris Hella Johnson (born Craig Morris Johnson, June 15, 1962) is an American choral conductor, composer, and arranger.

Life and career

Johnson was born on June 15, 1962 in Crow Wing County, Minnesota to Morris Melvin Johnson (1929-2015) and Marjorie Kathryn (Danielson) Johnson (b. 1931). He and one of his sisters adopted the name Hella, after the village in Norway that their family came from.

Originally from Minnesota, he studied piano and sang in the St. Olaf Choir at St. Olaf College, graduating in 1984. He went on to study at Juilliard, the University of Illinois at Urbana–Champaign, and Yale University, from which he received his Doctor of Musical Arts degree.

He founded and is the artistic director of the group Conspirare. He is also former artistic director of the Victoria Bach Festival and in 1998-1999 was the artistic director of Chanticleer, the second person to hold that position (after founder Louis Botto). In January 2001, Johnson was named director of the Houston Masterworks Chorus, a position he held for two years.

Johnson serves as Resident Artist in Choral Music at Texas State University and previously spent eight years as director of choral activities for The University of Texas.

In April 2013, Johnson was named the 2013 Texas State Musician, the second classical musician to receive the honor. In May 2013 Johnson was named Music Director/Conductor of Vocal Arts Ensemble in Cincinnati, Ohio.

On February 8, 2015 he and Conspirare won the Grammy Award for Best Choral Performance for their album The Sacred Spirit of Russia (Harmonia mundi HMU 807526).

He lives in Austin, Texas with his partner, architect Philip Overbaugh.

References

External links

Conspirare YouTube channel

1962 births
20th-century American composers
20th-century American conductors (music)
20th-century American male musicians
20th-century LGBT people
21st-century American composers
21st-century American conductors (music)
21st-century American male musicians
21st-century LGBT people
American choral conductors
American male composers
American male conductors (music)
American people of Norwegian descent
Classical musicians from Minnesota
Classical musicians from Texas
Juilliard School alumni
LGBT composers
American LGBT musicians
LGBT people from Minnesota
LGBT people from Texas
Living people
Musicians from Austin, Texas
St. Olaf College alumni
University of Texas faculty
Yale University alumni
Texas State University faculty